Frédéric Bastien is a Canadian author, historian, and journalist, best known for the book La Bataille de Londres. Dessous, secrets et coulisses du rapatriement constitutionnel, whose allegations surrounding the 1982 patriation of Canada's constitution caused political controversy in Quebec and led the Supreme Court of Canada to launch an internal probe.

Biography
Bastien holds a PhD in history and international politics from the Institut universitaire de hautes études internationales in Geneva and has authored two books dealing with Paris-Québec-Ottawa relations since the Quiet Revolution. He is currently a history professor at Dawson College in Montreal, Canada.

La Bataille de Londres
In La Bataille de Londres. Dessous, secrets et coulisses du rapatriement constitutionnel, Bastien alleges that the patriation of Canada's constitution in 1982 amounted to a "coup d'etat" because of interference by Canada's judiciary in the patriation process. In particular, Bastien names then Chief Justice of Canada, Bora Laskin, as interfering in the process of patriation in such a way as to breach the separation of executive and judicial powers.

These allegations were brought to the attention of then Chief Justice of Canada, Beverley McLachlin, who undertook to review the matter. In April 2013, the Supreme Court of Canada launched an internal investigation into the book's claims. However, the court concluded its review after failing to find relevant documents in its archives.

Reaction
Alexandre Cloutier, Quebec Intergovernmental Affairs Minister, claimed La Bataille de Londres "shows just how far prime minister Pierre Elliott Trudeau was ready to go and what means he was willing to use to force the Constitution down the throat of Quebecers, gestures that are extremely serious."

Canadian Prime Minister Stephen Harper, when asked about the controversy during a visit in Quebec, dismissed Bastien's allegations, saying "I think that the whole population is fed up with this discussion."

The Dorchester Review commented that Bastien "has ... succeeded in challenging the historical legitimacy and ethics of the Trudeau government ... revealing a new insight into the chicanery with which the Charter of Rights and Freedoms was imposed on Canadians, who did not need it and never asked for it." "Trudeau's Chief Judicial Activist," The Dorchester Review (Spring/Summer 2013, p. 94)

Political career
Bastien ran to be leader of the Parti Québécois in the 2020 Parti Québécois leadership election, and came in fourth, losing to Paul St-Pierre Plamondon.

Bibliography
 Relations particulières: la France face au Québec après de Gaulle (1999), Éditions du Boréal 
 Le poids de la coopération:le rapport France-Québec (2006), Québec Amérique 
 La Bataille de Londres: Dessous, secrets et coulisses du rapatriement constitutionnel (2013), Éditions du Boréal 
 The Battle of London: Trudeau, Thatcher, and the Fight for Canada's Constitution (2014), Dundurn Press

References

Year of birth missing (living people)
Living people
Graduate Institute of International and Development Studies alumni
21st-century Canadian historians
Canadian male non-fiction writers
Academic staff of Dawson College
Journalists from Quebec
Writers from Quebec
Canadian non-fiction writers in French
French Quebecers